Jeepster can mean any of the following:

Vehicles
 Willys-Overland Jeepster
 Jeepster Commando - produced by Kaiser Jeep
 Chinkara Jeepster - an Indian produced GRP bodied Willys MB clone
 Jeep Jeepster (concept car) - a 1998 concept for a V8-powered, off-road hot rod

Music
 Jeepster (song) - a T. Rex song
 Jeepster Records - a record label